Yuriy Tselykh (born 18 April 1979) is a Ukrainian former professional footballer.

External links

1979 births
Living people
Ukrainian footballers
Ukrainian Premier League players
Association football forwards
Ukrainian expatriate footballers
Expatriate footballers in Belarus
Ukrainian expatriate sportspeople in Belarus
Expatriate footballers in Uzbekistan
Ukrainian expatriate sportspeople in Uzbekistan
FC Zorya Luhansk players
FC Dynamo Kyiv players
FC Dynamo-2 Kyiv players
FC Dynamo-3 Kyiv players
FC Vorskla Poltava players
FC Vorskla-2 Poltava players
FC Hoverla Uzhhorod players
FC CSKA Kyiv players
FC Obolon-Brovar Kyiv players
FC Metalurh Zaporizhzhia players
FC Metalist Kharkiv players
FC Kharkiv players
FC Vitebsk players
FC Oleksandriya players
Navbahor Namangan players
MFC Mykolaiv players
FK Andijon players
FC Bukovyna Chernivtsi players
FC Shakhtar Sverdlovsk players